Burnside Island  lies off the coast of Western Australia and is around 59 hectares in size depending on the height of the tide. The southern tip of Burnside Island is located 1 km due east of the northern end of Simpson Island. The low, straight, narrow 2 km long island faces west-northwest into the gulf. It consists of the narrow high tide beach (WA 1637) backed by low scarped calcarenite bluffs, and a low grassy ridge widening to 200 m towards the northern end of the island. A 2 km wide mangrove-lined tidal creek backs the island. One kilometre to the north is Wilderness Island which is a more irregular, low 200 ha island consisting of a more exposed west-facing side.

Burnside Island is a popular bird watching and fishing location.

Burnside Island was named by Commodore Ian Burnside while surveying the area with the Royal Australian Navy.

See also

List of islands of Western Australia

References

Islands of the Gascoyne